Anatoli Anatolyevich Gerk (born 20 November 1984) is a Russian former professional footballer who played as a midfielder.

Club career
Gerk previously played for Anderlecht in the Belgian First Division and Twente in the Dutch Eredivisie.

In 2007, Gerk returned to Russia to sign with Saturn Ramenskoye which was managed by Gadzhi Gadzhiyev. He failed to make an appearance for the club, and only played for the reserves, scoring one goal against Shinnik Yaroslavl. In March 2009, he signed a contract with Ural Sverdlovsk Oblast. In 2011, he joined Mordovia Saransk, where he was part of the team winning the second-tier Russian Football National League in the 2011–12 season. In 2012–13, he returned to play for Ural. In 2014, Gerk signed with FC Tambov.

International career
Gerk took part in the 2001 UEFA European Under-16 Championship where he scored the only goal of the Russia team during the tournament against the Turkey, which proved to also be the 1–0 winner.

Honours
Anderlecht
 Belgian First Division: 2003–04

Mordovia Saransk
 Russian Football National League: 2011–12

Ural Sverdlovsk Oblast
 Russian Football National League: 2012–13

References

1984 births
People from Polevskoy
Living people
Russian footballers
Association football midfielders
Russia youth international footballers
Russia under-21 international footballers
Belgian Pro League players
Eredivisie players
Russian First League players
R.S.C. Anderlecht players
FC Twente players
FC Saturn Ramenskoye players
FC Ural Yekaterinburg players
FC Mordovia Saransk players
FC Tambov players
Russian expatriate footballers
Russian expatriate sportspeople in Belgium
Expatriate footballers in Belgium
Russian expatriate sportspeople in the Netherlands
Expatriate footballers in the Netherlands
Sportspeople from Sverdlovsk Oblast